The 2010 season was Police United's 8th season in the top division of Thai football. This article shows statistics of the club's players in the season, and also lists all matches that the club played in the season.

Team kit

Chronological list of events
26 November 2009'': Police announce that they will re-locate to the Thammasat Stadium in Rangsit for the 2010 campaign10 November 2009: The Thai Premier League 2010 season first leg fixtures were announced.14 July 2010: Police United were knocked out by TTM Phichit in the FA Cup third round.22 September 2010: Police United were knocked out by Osotspa Saraburi in the League Cup second round.24 October 2010''': Police United finished in 11th place in the Thai Premier League.

Current squad

Results

Thai Premier League

League table

FA Cup

Third round

League Cup

First round

1st Leg

2nd Leg

Second round

1st Leg

2nd Leg

Queen's Cup

References

2010
Thai football clubs 2010 season